The 2007 Skyrunner World Series was the 6th edition of the global skyrunning competition, Skyrunner World Series, organised by the International Skyrunning Federation from 2002.

Results
The World Cup has developed in 7 races from May to September.

Men's standings

References

External links
 Skyrunner World Series

2007
Skyrunner World Series